Donna Clarissa Ground (born 4 June 1970) known professionally as Donna Ewin, is an English former glamour model and actress.

Career
Donna Clarissa Ground was born on 4 June 1970, in Poplar, East London, England. Ewin was her mother's maiden name. Upon leaving college she joined the Yvonne Paul Management agency and first appeared on Page 3 of British newspaper The Sun at the age of 17. She found herself in great demand, establishing herself as one of the most popular Page 3 girls on the circuit during the late 1980s and early '90s.

Ewin appeared in many adult magazines including Mayfair and Playboy (sometimes using the pseudonym Nina Downe – an anagram of Donna Ewin); and it was erroneously rumoured that she appeared as an extra in the famous orgy scene in Stanley Kubrick's last film, Eyes Wide Shut (1999). She did appear regularly on the BBC sketch comedy television show The Fast Show as well as the touring live stage version of the show, notably in the "Mr. and Mrs. Shag" sketch.

Filmography
The Fast Show (TV series, 1996–2000)
The Best of British Babefest 2 (1997)
The Fast Show Live (1998)
Bedrooms and Hallways (1998)
Norman Ormal: A Very Political Turtle (1998)
Ted and Ralph (1998)
Eyes Wide Shut (1999)
Last Christmas (1999)
Kevin & Perry Go Large (2000)
The Curse of Page 3 (TV documentary, 2003)
Family Business (TV series, 2004)

References

External links

1970 births
English female models
English female adult models
Glamour models
Living people
Page 3 girls
People from Bethnal Green